Greencastle Township is one of thirteen townships in Putnam County, Indiana. As of the 2010 census, its population was 13,136 and it contained 4,810 housing units.  This township contains the county seat of Greencastle and is home to DePauw University, a liberal arts college of 2,300 students.

History
Forest Hill Cemetery and the Alfred Hirt House are listed on the National Register of Historic Places.

Geography

Cities and towns
 Greencastle

Unincorporated towns
 Edgewood Lake at 
 Fox Ridge at 
 Limedale at 
(This list is based on USGS data and may include former settlements.)

References

External links
 Indiana Township Association
 United Township Association of Indiana

Townships in Putnam County, Indiana
Townships in Indiana